Denis Pjeshka (born 28 May 1995 in Shkodër) is an Albanian football player who currently plays as a defender for Albanian club Flamurtari.

Club career
In the summer of 2014 he had a four-day trial with Italian Lega Pro side Catanzaro, but returned to Vllaznia for the 2014–15 season. In summer 2019, he joined Flamurtari from Laçi.

References

External links
 Profile - FSHF

1995 births
Living people
Footballers from Shkodër
Albanian footballers
Association football defenders
KF Vllaznia Shkodër players
KF Laçi players
Flamurtari Vlorë players
Kategoria Superiore players